Carabus gebleri is a species of beetle found in Russia and Kazakhstan.

External links
List of Carabus (Morphocarabus) species at carabus.eu

gebleri
Beetles described in 1817